Coelioxys fenestrata is a species of leaf-cutting bee in the genus Coelioxys, of the family Megachilidae. It is found in India, and recordings from Sri Lanka is uncertain.

Notes

References
 http://www.atlashymenoptera.net/biblio/Karunaratne_et_al_2006_Sri_Lanka.pdf
 https://www.academia.edu/7390502/AN_UPDATED_CHECKLIST_OF_BEES_OF_SRI_LANKA_WITH_NEW_RECORDS
 http://beesind.com/beesind2/coelioxys.htm

Fenest
Hymenoptera of Asia
Insects of India
Insects described in 1873